Thomas Hatto (born August 1995) is an English actor and model, probably best known for his roles in the Hollywood movie Thor: The Dark World (2013) and the documentary The Youth Justice System. He has also modelled for Calvin Klein, Rayban and GQ.

Career
Hatto first started his career after being cast as the lead role in a made-for-television drama documentary titled The Youth Justice System. Hatto promoted the show on various radio and media outlets in the South West of England. In 2010, Hatto moved to London to pursue journalism. He attended the 54th London Film Festival at the Never Let Me Go premiere, where he interviewed Keira Knightley and Andrew Garfield.

Hatto cites his inspiration for becoming an actor was after meeting Dustin Hoffman at the 56th London Film Festival in 2012, where Hoffman told him he "had a face for camera". Shortly after this, Hatto landed a small role in the Marvel superhero movie Thor: The Dark World He presented a documentary countdown for Channel 4 titled Channel 4 love Jennifer Lopez!.

In 2013, Hatto auditioned for the lead role for Jennifer Lopez's The Boy Next Door. Hatto also makes a brief appearance in The Saturdays video for "Disco Love".

In May 2013, Hatto became a spokesperson to promote 'The Color Run UK' and appeared in their commercials. At the world premiere of Fast & Furious 6 in London, Hatto revealed he was working on some film projects in the upcoming year.

It was announced in July 2017 via Instagram that Hatto, along with Jeremy Irvine and Zach Roerig had joined the cast of The Last Full Measure. Hatto is currently penning his first book and launching a clothing collection, both due for release in 2019.

In March 2019, it was announced Hatto will play the love interest of Lili Reinhart in Hustlers directed by Lorene Scafaria.

Personal life

Hatto was born in Swindon, England. He is of British-Thai descent. He also has an avid interest in scuba diving, surfing and MMA. He has an open water diving certification. Hatto has been in a relationship with his girlfriend since 2016. He is fluent in Thai and Italian.

Filmography

References

External links
 
 

1995 births
Living people
Actors from Swindon
Actors of Thai descent
British male actors of Asian descent
English male film actors
English male television actors
English people of Thai descent
Male actors from Wiltshire